Barnita Bagchi (born 12 June 1973) is a Bengali-speaking Indian feminist advocate, historian, and literary scholar. She is a faculty member in literary studies at Utrecht University, and was previously at the Institute of Development Studies, Kolkata at the University of Calcutta. She was educated at Jadavpur University, in Kolkata, St Hilda's College, Oxford, and at the Trinity College, Cambridge.

She is a feminist historian, utopian studies scholar, literary scholar, and researcher of girls' and women's education and writing. She is also well-known also as translator and scholar of Bengali and South Asian feminist Begum Rokeya Sakhawat Hossain.

She is the daughter of economist Amiya Kumar Bagchi and feminist critic and activist Jasodhara Bagchi.

Selected works
Pliable Pupils and Sufficient Self-Directors: Narratives of Female Education by Five British Women Writers, 1778-1814  (2004)
Webs of History: Information, Communication, and Technology from Early to Post-Colonial India  (Co-ed., with Amiya Kumar Bagchi and Dipankar Sinha, 2005)
Sultana’s Dream and Padmarag: Two Feminist Utopias, by Rokeya Sakhawat Hossain, part-translated and introduced by Barnita Bagchi (2005)
'In Tarini Bhavan: Rokeya Sakhawat Hossains Padmarag und der Reichtum des südasiatischen Feminismus in der Förderung nicht konfessionsgebundener, den Geschlechtern gerecht werdender menschlicher Entwicklung', in Wie schamlos doch die Mädchen geworden sind! Bildnis von Rokeya Sakhawat Hossain  ed. G.A. Zakaria (Berlin: IKO—Verlag fur Interkulturelle Kommunikation, 2006)

References

External links
 Review by Sachidananda Mohanty of Bagchi's book Pliable Pupils and Sufficient Self-Directors, in Economic and Political Weekly 
 Jackie Kirk and Shree Mulay, McGill University, Academic Article 'Towards a Sustainable Peace: Prioritizing Education for Girls', drawing on Bagchi's academic work on girls' and women's education in South Asia
 Gender Page of Uttorshuri, website of Bangladeshi feminists and social thinkers, anthologizing Bagchi's writing on Rokeya and women's education in South Asia
 Awaaz-South Asia website (public interest group working for secularism in South Asia from the UK) anthologizing Bagchi's writing on Indian multiculturalism
 Asiapeace.org, website of the Association for Communal Harmony in Asia (ACHA) anthologizing Bagchi's writing on syncretism 
 The Independent, London, 2 December 2005 chooses Bagchi's introduction and translation of Padmarag as a book of the year
 'Girls' Education in Murshidabad: Tales from the Field,' 2003
 'Engendering ICT and Social Capital', 2005
 'Multiculturalism Alive in India', article, 2003
 'Rokeya Sakhawat Hossain' article, 2003
 'Inside Tarini Bhavan: Rokeya Sakhawat Hossain's Padmarag and the Richness of South Asian Feminism in Furthering Unsectarian, Gender-Just Human Development', article, 2003
 'Bengali Folklore and Children’s Literature', article, 2006
 'The Heroines of Dignified Struggle', review article, 2006
 Translation, Santosh Kumar Ghose's short story 'Hoina', 2002
 'Instruction a Torment?: Jane Austen’s Early Writing and Conflicting Versions of Female Education in Romantic-Era ‘Conservative’ British Women’s Novels’, 2005
 Review of 'Storylines', 2003
 'Not This, Not This', review article, 2007 
 'Securing Gender Justice', review article, 2007
 'Violence and the Work of Time', review article, 2007
 'The Ultimate Site of Social Coercion,' review article, 2007
 'Feminist Economics', review article, 2006
 'Feminist History', review article, 2006

1973 births
Bengali Hindus
20th-century Bengalis
21st-century Bengalis
Living people
Feminist studies scholars
Women writers from West Bengal
20th-century Indian translators
Indian feminist writers
Jadavpur University alumni
Alumni of St Hilda's College, Oxford
Alumni of Trinity College, Cambridge
Academic staff of the University of Calcutta
Academic staff of Utrecht University
Indian expatriates in the Netherlands
Writers from Kolkata
Indian women educational theorists
Indian women translators
Educators from West Bengal
Women educators from West Bengal
20th-century women writers
20th-century Indian women